News18 India  is an Indian Media television channel owned by Network 18. It was launched in 2005 as Channel 7 by Jagran Prakashan Limited and acquired in 2006 by Network 18 and rebranded IBN7. In 2016 it took its current name.
In 2013, News18 India launched, on channel 520 on the UK's Sky TV platform News18, a live version of the parent channel.

Popular shows

 Aar Paar
Aar Paar is Hindi news show which aired daily at 7pm having Amish Devgan as anchor.

 Ham to puchhenge
It runs daily at 8 pm.

 Desh Nahin Jhukne Denge with Aman Chopra

See also
 Network 18
 CNN-News18

References

Hindi-language television channels in India
Television channels and stations established in 2006
24-hour television news channels in India
Television stations in New Delhi
2012 establishments in Delhi
Network18 Group